is a former Japanese football player.

Playing career
Kidera was born in Hidaka on April 4, 1972. After graduating from high school, he joined the Japan Soccer League club NKK in 1991. In 1992, the Japan Soccer League was dissolved and the club joined the new Japan Football League (JFL). Kidera became a regular goalkeeper in 1992. However he did not play much in 1993 and the club was disbanded at the end of the 1993 season. In 1994, he moved to the JFL club Kyoto Purple Sanga. Although he played for two seasons, he did not participate in many matches. In 1996, he moved to the Regional Leagues club Honda Luminozo Sayama and played for two seasons. In 1998, he moved to the JFL club Albirex Niigata. He played often and the club was promoted to the new J2 League in 1999. He competed with Shinya Yoshihara for a position and played often until 2000. However he played less often than Yosuke Nozawa in 2001. The club won the championship in 2003 and was promoted to the J1 League in 2004. In 2004, he played often during the summer after Nozawa was injured. Although he became a regular goalkeeper in late 2005, he was released from the club for generational change at the end of the 2005 season. In 2006, he moved to the J1 club Sanfrecce Hiroshima. However he did not play as often as Takashi Shimoda and the club was relegated to J2 in 2008. In 2008, he became a regular goalkeeper after Shimoda got hurt. Kidera injured his shoulder in June and could not play at all after the injury. In 2009, he moved to the Regional Leagues club Zweigen Kanazawa. He played often and the club was promoted to the Japan Football League in 2010. However he retired at the end of the 2009 season.

Club statistics

References

External links

1972 births
Living people
Association football people from Saitama Prefecture
Japanese footballers
Japan Soccer League players
J1 League players
J2 League players
Japan Football League (1992–1998) players
NKK SC players
Kyoto Sanga FC players
Albirex Niigata players
Sanfrecce Hiroshima players
Zweigen Kanazawa players
Association football goalkeepers